Laurence G. Rahme is an American microbiologist who is Professor of Surgery and Microbiology at Harvard Medical School (HMS). At Massachusetts General Hospital (MGH) she also holds the title of Director of the Molecular Surgical Laboratory as a Microbiologists in the Department of Surgery and Molecular Biology at.   Additionally, she holds a Senior Scientific Staff position at Shriners Hospitals for Children-Boston.

Early life and education 

She received her B.Sc. from the University of Naples, Italy, her M.S. from the Institute of Genetics and Biophysics C.N.R., University of Naples, Italy, and her Ph.D. from the University of California at Berkeley.  She completed her postdoctoral training at the Department of Molecular Biology Massachusetts General Hospital/ and Department of Genetics Harvard Medical School.  She was also awarded an honorary M.S. degree from Harvard Medical School.

Research 
Rahme is best known for her pioneering work on Pseudomonas aeruginosa, demonstrating for the first time that this bacterium shares a subset of virulence factors required for the full expression of pathogenicity in both plants and animals, and for the identification of a quorum sensing (QS) system in Pseudomonas aeruginosa the MvfR (PqsR) system</ref>. Using plants as a model host to study Pseudomonas aeruginosa pathogenicity led her and her colleagues to develop multi-host model systems for the identification of virulence factors in bacteria in a high throughput manner. Researchers studying the human opportunistic pathogen Pseudomonas aeruginosa in the laboratory setting internationally today often use the multi-host infection models developed using the "PA14" strain she identified as a model strain   Using her established system, she uncovered that the multiple virulence factor regulator (MvfR) is a key regulator of bacterial quorum-sensing signaling and pathogenesis in various host organisms.  Based on these findings, she works on the development of anti-virulence drugs as an alternative or adjunct to antibiotics and co-founded in 2014 Spero Therapeutics in Cambridge, MA. Her work in host-pathogen interactions continues to inspire researchers in developing novel ways to fight infections. Her group efforts in developing prognostic biomarkers for the identification of patients at high risk for multiple infections is expected to open new avenues in the personalized care of these patients.

Rahme has published an extensive number (100+) of scientific articles and holds more than 15 patents with applications to combat bacterial infections and strategies to limit the emergence of antibiotic resistant strains.  She has also been on, or currently serves on Advisory and Editorial Boards of numerous scientific journals and served as an ad-hoc member on review panels at the National Institutes of Health (NIH), National Science Foundation (NSF), Department of Defense (DoD) and several national and international research foundations.  Her numerous prizes and honors include being elected as an American Academy of Microbiology Fellow in 2017.

Awards and honors 

 2020-2025 MGH Research Scholar
 2017 Elected to the American Academy of Microbiology

References 

Year of birth missing (living people)
Living people
Harvard Medical School faculty
Women microbiologists
Fellows of the American Academy of Microbiology